Dream Evil is the fourth studio album by American heavy metal band Dio, released on July 21, 1987. It features former Rough Cutt members Craig Goldy and Claude Schnell, and includes the singles "All the Fools Sailed Away" and "I Could Have Been a Dreamer". Dream Evil was Dio's last album to feature mascot Murray on the cover and also the last to feature drummer Vinny Appice until the 1993 album Strange Highways. It was also the last album to feature bassist Jimmy Bain until the release of 2000's Magica. The album also marks Schnell's final appearance with Dio.

Track listing
All lyrics by Ronnie James Dio, music as stated.

Personnel
Dio
Ronnie James Dio – vocals
Vinny Appice – drums
Jimmy Bain – bass
Craig Goldy – guitars
Claude Schnell – keyboards

Additional musicians
 Mitchell Singing Boys – chorus on "All the Fools Sailed Away"

Production
 Recorded at Village Recorder, Los Angeles, California
 Produced by Ronnie James Dio
 Engineered by Angelo Arcuri
 Assistant engineered by Charlie Brocco, Tom Biener and Allen Abrahamson
 Mixed at Record Plant, Los Angeles, California
 Originally mastered by George Marino at Sterling Sound, New York City
 Cover illustration by Steve Huston
 Cover model: Amanda Schendel

Charts

Album

Singles

I Could Have Been a Dreamer

See also
1987 in music

References

External links 
"I Could Have Been a Dreamer" video clip
Dream Evil song lyrics

1987 albums
Dio (band) albums
Warner Records albums
Vertigo Records albums